Huastec can refer to either:

Huastec people, an indigenous group of Mexico
Huastec language (also called "Wasteko" and "Teenek"), spoken by the Huastec people
 Huastec civilization, the pre-Columbian ancestors of the modern day Huastec people

See also
 La Huasteca, a geographical and cultural region located in eastern Mexico along the Gulf of Mexico, associated with the Huastec people
 La Huasteca (climbing area), a municipal park in Monterrey, Mexico

Language and nationality disambiguation pages